Quivet may refer to:

 An obsolete trade name for meprobamate
 Quivet Neck, an area of Cape Cod